Željko Bajčeta (born 20 April 1967) is a retired Montenegrin footballer who played as a forward.

Club career
He mainly played for clubs in Cyprus and Yugoslavia. He also played for FC Seoul of the South Korean K League, then known as the LG Cheetahs.

References

External links
 
 

1967 births
Living people
Footballers from Nikšić
Association football forwards
Yugoslav footballers
Serbia and Montenegro footballers
FK Sutjeska Nikšić players
FK Spartak Subotica players
Olympiakos Nicosia players
AEL Limassol players
APEP FC players
FC Seoul players
Yugoslav First League players
Cypriot First Division players
K League 1 players
Yugoslav expatriate footballers
Serbia and Montenegro expatriate footballers
Expatriate footballers in Cyprus
Yugoslav expatriate sportspeople in Cyprus
Serbia and Montenegro expatriate sportspeople in Cyprus
Expatriate footballers in South Korea
Serbia and Montenegro expatriate sportspeople in South Korea